The 2009 Tallahassee Tennis Challenger was a professional tennis tournament played on outdoor hard courts. It was part of the 2009 ATP Challenger Tour. It took place in Tallahassee, Florida, United States between 20 and 26 April 2009.

Singles entrants

Seeds

 Rankings are as of April 12, 2009.

Other entrants
The following players received wildcards into the singles main draw:
  Jean-Yves Aubone
  Taylor Dent
  Michael McClune
  Tim Smyczek

The following players received entry from the qualifying draw:
  Ričardas Berankis
  Colin Fleming
  Andis Juška
  Jesse Witten

The following players received special exempt into the singles main draw:
  Im Kyu-tae

Champions

Men's singles

 John Isner def.  Donald Young, 7–5, 6–4

Men's doubles

 Eric Butorac /  Scott Lipsky def.  Colin Fleming /  Ken Skupski, 6–1, 6–4

References
2009 Draws
Official website
ITF search 

Tallahassee Tennis Challenger
Tennis tournaments in the United States
Tallahassee Tennis Challenger
Tallahassee Tennis Challenger